"Two Little Boys" is a song published in 1903 by American composer Theodore F. Morse and lyricist Edward Madden. 

The first recording was by American singer Billy Murray who released it in the United States in 1903 with the title "When We Were Two Little Boys". It became a popular music hall song of the time, especially by Scottish singer Harry Lauder. Sheet music published in the United States in 1903 has a photograph of vaudeville singer and recording artist Dan W. Quinn, with the words "Successfully sung by Dan W. Quinn".  

It describes the story of two boys who grow up to fight in a war. The incident described in the song almost certainly refers to an incident in the Boer War, in March or April 1900, described in a book written about the war by two members of an English volunteer regiment published in 1902. The incident is described on page 60, and involved members of the Australian contingent. "It was during one of these patrols that the Boers, lying in wait for the Australians, fired into them, killing one of their horses; the dismounted man sprang up behind a comrade and galloped away pursued by the Boers. Suddenly in front appeared a strong barbed wire boundary fence, five or six strands high. The Boers made sure of their prey; but the Australians, riding without hesitation at the wire, cleared it, every one of them, the horse carrying two men as gallantly as the rest. Needless to say, these were no Cape ponies or Argentines, but fine Australian horses; indeed it was impossible not to be filled with admiration at the way this contingent was mounted, many of the horses in the ranks being high-class steeplechase animals of bone and substance, and of a very fine stamp."

It could also refer to the American Civil War, ranks so blue meaning the union side of the war. 

In 1969, it became a surprise No. 1 top-selling single for entertainer Rolf Harris in the United Kingdom.

Rolf Harris
In 1969 the song "Two Little Boys" was revived by Australian entertainer Rolf Harris with Alan Braden co-writing and arranging the song after having it sung down the phone from Australia to him by Harris. Back in the UK, Harris persuaded his television producer to incorporate the song into his BBC variety show. Alan Braden arranged and co-wrote the song for the TV show, and a favourable audience reaction prompted Harris to record and release it as a single. The song reached number 1 on the UK Singles Chart on 18 December 1969, where it stayed for six weeks, thus becoming the first chart-topping single of the 1970s as well as the last of the 1960s. On BBC Radio Blackburn in 1979, Margaret Thatcher picked it as a favourite song.

In October 2008, Harris announced he would re-record the song, backed by North Wales's Froncysyllte Male Voice Choir, to mark the 90th anniversary of the end of World War I. Proceeds from the new release went to The Poppy Appeal. Harris was inspired to make the recording after participating in My Family at War, a short series of programmes in the BBC's Remembrance season, which was broadcast in November 2008. He discovered that the experiences of his father and uncle during World War I mirrored the lyrics of the song.

Other versions 
The song was covered in 1980 by Splodgenessabounds and reached number 26 on the UK Singles Chart.

In popular culture 
In the film Trainspotting, Spud sings the song in the pub after Tommy’s funeral.

Scottish comedian Billy Connolly recorded a parody of the song with new lyrics entitled "Two Little Boys in Blue" on his Raw Meat for the Balcony LP in 1977. This version of the song told the story of two boys who grow up to be policemen. 

American cartoonist and songwriter Shel Silverstein also recorded a parody, called "Civil War Song," for his 1962 album Inside Folk Songs which is sung from the perspective of a third brother wearing tight blue pants and a grey sport jacket who opts out of fighting to "stay at home with the girls."

Two Little Boys is the original title of New Zealand film Deano and Nige's Best Last Day Ever. The Rolf Harris version appears early in the film before giving way to a punk version as the two leads are introduced. Throughout the film one of them imagines himself as a soldier helping his childhood friend despite the cost to himself. As the actors/characters are from Australia and New Zealand, this could also serve as a nod to the ANZAC spirit - the historic military brotherhood shared between the two countries since World War I.

"Two Little Boys" was a title of an episode of The Brittas Empire, the song is referenced during the episode and its tune is played towards the end of the episode.

The song would appear to have its origins in the fiction of the Victorian children's writer Juliana Horatia Ewing, whose book Jackanapes was a story about the eponymous hero and his friend Tom, who having ridden wooden horses as two little boys end up together on a battlefield. There Jackanapes rides to the rescue of the wounded and dismounted Tom. Jackanapes nobly replies to Tom's entreaties to save himself, "Leave you"? "To save my skin"? "No, Tom, not to save my soul". And unfortunately takes a fatal bullet in the process.

Football chants
Hartlepool United football fans have sung "Two Little Boys" on the terraces since the 1980s. A version by a group of Hartlepool fans was released as a double A-side with "Never Say Die" on the single "Poolie Pride", recorded under the name of "Monkey Hangerz", reaching number 24 on the UK Singles Chart in 2006.

See also
List of number-one singles of 1969 and 1970 (Ireland)
List of UK Singles Chart number ones of the 1960s
List of UK Singles Chart number ones of the 1970s

References

External links

BBC article discussing the origin of the song

Songs of the American Civil War
Songs about soldiers
1902 songs
1969 singles
1980 singles
Rolf Harris songs
Pinky and Perky songs
Irish Singles Chart number-one singles
UK Singles Chart number-one singles
Songs with lyrics by Edward Madden
Songs with music by Theodore F. Morse
Christmas number-one singles in the United Kingdom